The European Parliament (Representation) Act 2003 (c.7) was an Act of the Parliament of the United Kingdom. The long title is "An Act to make provision enabling alterations to be made to the total number of Members of the European Parliament to be elected for the United Kingdom and to their distribution between the electoral regions; to make provision for and in connection with the establishment of an electoral region including Gibraltar for the purposes of European Parliamentary elections; and for connected purposes."

The Act made provision for a reduction in the number of Members of the European Parliament who represent the United Kingdom (see Treaty of Nice). Gibraltar was enfranchised by adding it to the South West England constituency after taking the British Government to the European Court of Justice.

The number of seats each region was allocated is as follows:

East Midlands 6 
Eastern 8 
London 10 
North East 4 
North West 10 
South East 11 
South West 7 
West Midlands 8 
Yorkshire and the Humber  7 
Scotland 8 
Wales 5 
Northern Ireland 3

The addition of Gibraltar to the English constituency gave rise to some problems concerning the jurisdiction of the Courts of England and Wales and the Courts of Gibraltar over which would have power to hear election petitions, this can be seen by some of the discussions held in the Standing Committee during the bill stage.

The European Union (Withdrawal) Act 2018 repealed the act on 31 January 2020.

References

External links
The European Parliament (Representation) Act 2003, as originally enacted, from the Office of Public Sector Information.
 European Parliament (Representation) Act (Department for Constitutional Affairs)

United Kingdom Acts of Parliament 2003
European Parliament elections in the United Kingdom
Election law in the United Kingdom
Gibraltar and the European Union
European Parliament elections in Gibraltar
2003 in Gibraltar
Election legislation